Phan Văn Đức (born 11 April 1996) is a Vietnamese professional footballer who plays as a winger for V.League 1 club Công An Hà Nội and the Vietnam national team.

International career

International goals

U-23
Scores and results list Vietnam's goal tally first. Only results against national teams were counted

Olympics

Vietnam
Scores and results list Vietnam's goal tally first.

Honours
Song Lam Nghe An 
Vietnamese Cup: 2017
Vietnam U23/Olympic
VFF Cup: 2018
AFC U-23 Asian Cup runners-up: 2018
Asian Games fourth place: 2018
Vietnam
AFF Championship: 2018; runners-up 2022
VFF Cup: 2022

References 

1996 births
Living people
Vietnamese footballers
Association football wingers
V.League 1 players
Song Lam Nghe An FC players
People from Nghệ An province
Footballers at the 2018 Asian Games
2019 AFC Asian Cup players
Asian Games competitors for Vietnam
Vietnam international footballers